Lanzuela is a municipality located in the province of Teruel, Aragon, Spain. According to the 2010 census the municipality has a population of 102 inhabitants.

Lanzuela is located at the western end of the Sierra de Cucalón area. There are two shrines (ermitas) in the town, the Ermita de Jesús Nazareno and the Ermita de Santa Bárbara, built in the 18th century.

Gallery

See also
Jiloca Comarca
List of municipalities in Teruel

References

External links 

CAI Aragon - Lanzuela
Sierra de Cucalón
Guía general de las sierras de Cucalón, Oriche y Fonfría

Municipalities in the Province of Teruel